Pagalungan, officially the Municipality of Pagalungan (Maguindanaon: Inged nu Pagalungan; Iranun: Inged a Pagalungan), is a 1st class municipality in the province of Maguindanao del Sur, Bangsamoro, Philippines. According to the 2020 census, it has a population of 46,277 people.

Etymology
“Pagalungan” is a Maguindanaon word for “mirror”. During the Spanish time, Pagalungan was a mere sitio. There was a small creek in it running towards a small pond called "Migkawa" by the natives of the place. The pond was deep and clear of which the women of the place used it as mirror. Today, the place and the entire municipality are known by the name of “Pagalungan”.

History
Pagalungan was part of Midsayap municipality before it became a regular municipality on August 18, 1947, by virtue of Executive Order No. 41 issued during the administration of then President Manuel A. Roxas. The first appointed and elected mayor was the late Gorgonio P. Initan, a former public school teacher. The succeeding mayors were Datu Tumindig Sultan, 1950–1953; Hadji Abubacar Pendatun, 1954–1962; Bai Tonina P. Matalam Adil, 1963–1971, Datu Malunsing Matalam, 1972–1975; Datu Balumol P. Mama, 1975–1977; Bai Chito Matalam, 1973–1986, Datu Norodin M. Matalam, 1986–1988, Datu Udtog P. Matalam, Jr., 1988- December 16, 1995; Datu Macabangen K. Montawal,Dec.1995-June 2007; Datu Norodin M. Matalam, 2007–2013, and from the later date to present is Datu Salik P. Mamasabulod.

The municipality was the capital of the province of Cotabato, during the time which it encompasses the present-day provinces of Cotabato, Maguindanao and Sultan Kudarat, from 1966 to 1973. During that time, at an estimated population of 30,000-40,000 in 1960, it was also the most populous municipality in the province, almost to be converted into a city during the decade, but internal conflicts and sporadic rebellions in its vicinity especially during 1970s and 1980s resulted in the somewhat stagnant population growth of the town until the foundation of ARMM in 1990 as some of its inhabitants fled towards parts of what was now the Soccsksargen region, particularly in what is now the Cotabato province, to avoid strife. The municipality ceased to be the capital of Cotabato province in 1973 as it was included as an integral part of the newly created province of Maguindanao, where it currently belongs today.

The municipality of Pagagawan was carved out from Pagalungan town under Muslim Mindanao Autonomy Act No. 95 on July 18, 2000.

Geography

Barangays
Pagalungan is politically subdivided into 12 barangays.
 Bagoenged
 Buliok
 Damalasak
 Galakit
 Inug-ug
 Kalbugan
 Kilangan
 Kudal
 Layog
 Linandangan
 Poblacion
 Dalgan

Climate

Demographics

Economy

References

External links
   Pagalungan Profile at the DTI Cities and Municipalities Competitive Index
 [ Philippine Standard Geographic Code]
Philippine Census Information
Local Governance Performance Management System

Municipalities of Maguindanao del Sur
Populated places on the Rio Grande de Mindanao
Former provincial capitals of the Philippines
Establishments by Philippine executive order